Laramie County School District #2 is a public school district based in Pine Bluffs, Wyoming, United States.

Geography
Laramie County School District #2 serves the eastern portion of Laramie County, including the following communities:

Incorporated places
Town of Albin
Town of Burns
Town of Pine Bluffs
Unincorporated places
Carpenter
Egbert
Hillsdale
Meriden

Schools
Grades 7-12
Burns Junior/Senior High School
Pine Bluffs Junior/Senior High School
Grades K-6
Albin Elementary School
Carpenter Elementary School
Pine Bluffs Elementary School
Burns Elementary School (formerly West Elementary School)

Student demographics
The following figures are as of October 1, 2008.

Total District Enrollment: 841
Student enrollment by gender
Male: 445 (52.91%)
Female: 396 (47.09%)
Student enrollment by ethnicity
White (not Hispanic): 731 (86.92%)
Hispanic: 85 (10.11%)
American Indian or Alaskan Native: 12 (1.43%)
Asian or Pacific Islander: 7 (0.83%)
Black (not Hispanic): 6 (0.71%)

See also
List of school districts in Wyoming

References

External links
Laramie County School District #2 – official site.

Education in Laramie County, Wyoming
School districts in Wyoming